Oil wrestling is one of the wrestling ethnosports, which has a tournament at every edition of the Ethnosport Cultural Festival held annually in Turkey.

The tournament has different categories. Not all categories are included below.

TEŞVİK

Tozkorpan

AYAK GÜREŞİ

BÜYÜK ORTA

BAŞ ALTI

Sources

Recurring sporting events established in 2016
Annual sporting events in Turkey
Events at multi-sport events
Folk wrestling styles
Wrestling in Turkey